Peineta may refer to:

Peineta (album), a studio album by the rock band Los Tres
Peineta (comb), a large decorative comb to keep a mantilla in place